Shake a Lil' Somethin' is the seventh studio album by Miami-based hip hop group 2 Live Crew. It was released on August 6, 1996 via Lil' Joe Records and was produced by Mr. Mixx. The album would make it to #145 on the Billboard 200 and #33 on the Top R&B/Hip-Hop Albums and three singles: "Shake a Lil' Somethin'", which peaked at #11 on the Hot Rap Singles chart, "Do the Damn Thing", which made it to #24 on the same chart, and "Be My Private Dancer", which peaked at #34. At the time of this album, Fresh Kid Ice had left the New 2 Live Crew (which consisted of himself, Luther Campbell and Verb) and Luke Records to re-join original members Mr. Mixx and Brother Marquis. However, the reunion would be short lived as Mr. Mixx would leave the group after this album and Marquis would leave after the next album.

Track listing

References

External links

1996 albums
2 Live Crew albums

id:The 2 Live Crew Is What We Are